Herriman is a city in southwestern Salt Lake County, Utah. The population was 55,144 as of the 2020 census. Although Herriman was a town in 2000, it has since been classified as a fourth-class city by state law. The city has experienced rapid growth since incorporation in 1999, as its population was just 1,523 at the 2000 census. It grew from being the 111th-largest incorporated place in Utah in 2000 to the 14th-largest in 2020.

History

Founding 
Herriman was established in 1851 by Henry Harriman, Thomas Jefferson Butterfield, John Jay Stocking, and Robert Cowan Petty. A fort was established where the community garden is today. The only remnants of Fort Herriman are the two black locust trees that stand where the entrance to the fort once was. The Fort was abandoned in 1857 as the Johnston Army came West.

Incorporation 
Herriman remained a small community until 1999, when proactive citizens, including Brett Wood, Michelle Baguley, Marion Millett, Jerry Walker and J. Lynn Crane, went door to door asking people to sign a petition to be incorporated into a town. In 1998 Rose Creek Estates, developed by Watt Homes, started the first "subdivision" with the property under 1 acre. Later, Rosecrest, a land developer who acquired some rights in a large area around Herriman, started large-scale residential development. Rosecrest is owned by parent company Sorenson Companies founded by the late James LeVoy Sorenson and currently managed by his son. The lawsuit stemmed from a struggle between Bluffdale city officials, strict city building requirements, and Rosecrest. The addition of Rosecrest greatly brought up Herriman's population and enabled the town to be turned into a city.

Natural disasters

Flooding 
In 2014, the cemetery on Pioneer Street flooded, leaving many graves washed up. The City restored most of the graves and adjusted drainage in to accommodate for future issues.

In 2018, a water line broke on 13400 S., causing flooding to businesses and houses. The main line broke due to a gardening tool hitting the water line.

Fires 
Often, the City experiences fires. In 2018, a youth was playing with smoke bombs in dry grass, resulting in 160 acres burnt and three houses destroyed. The exposed mountains, dry brush, and open fields make Herriman highly susceptible to fires.

Machine Gun Fire 
On September 19, 2010, the National Guard was performing an exercise at Camp Williams, south of Herriman, when a tracer bullet likely struck a rock, setting off a  wildfire. Unified Fire Authority members mobilized and were able to arrest the progress of the fire, but not before three homes were destroyed and another damaged. Various small structures were also affected. Over 1,200 homes were evacuated in the face of the oncoming danger, with most of them able to return by Tuesday, September 21, 2010.

Geography
According to the United States Census Bureau, the city has a total area of 20.3 square miles (52.5 km2), all land. The city frequently annexes new areas west and east of its borders. The newest annexation was in 2018 when part of Kennecott Copper Mine's land was annexed to make way for technology centers.

Herriman shares borders with Riverton to the east, South Jordan to the north, and Bluffdale to the southeast.

Demographics

According to estimates from the U.S. Census Bureau, as of 2017, there were 39,224 people in Herriman. The racial makeup of the county was 83.3% non-Hispanic White, 2.2% Black, 0.8% Asian, 1.6% Pacific Islander, and 4.4% from two or more races. 8.0% of the population were Hispanic or Latino of any race.

As of the census of 2010, there were 21,785 people, 5,542 households, and 5,022 families residing in the town. The population density was 1075.0 people per square mile (64.5/km2). There were 6,022 housing units at an average density of 297.2 per square mile (19.4/km2). The racial makeup of the town was 93.3% White, 0.3% Native American, 1.3% Asian, 0.5% Pacific Islander, 0.3% from other races, and 2.3% from two or more races. Hispanic or Latino of any race were 6.2% of the population.

There were 5,542 households, out of which 44.1% had children under 18 living with them, 81.3% were married couples living together, 6.1% had a female householder with no husband present, and 9.4% were non-families. 6.5% of all households were made up of individuals, and 1.0% had someone living alone who was 65 years or older. The average household size was 3.93, and the average family size was 4.13.

In the town, the population was spread out, with 44.1% under 18, 6.1% from 18 to 24, 29.0% from 25 to 44, 11.7% from 45 to 64, and 2.6% who were 65 years of age or older. The median age was 24.7 years. For every 100 females, there were 102.4 males. For every 100 females aged 18 and over, there were 100.7 males.

The median income for a household in the town was $56,361, and the median income for a family was $57,404. Males had a median income of $44,135 versus $30,893 for females. The per capita income was $18,991. About 2.9% of families and 3.9% of the population were below the poverty line, including 5.7% of those under age 18 and none aged 65 or over.

Education 
Herriman has two high schools, Herriman High School, which opened in 2010, and Mountain Ridge High School, which opened in 2019. Herriman also is home to Fort Herriman Middle School and Copper Mountain Middle School. Elementary schools include Herriman, Butterfield Canyon, Silvercrest, Blackridge, Bastian, and Ridge View, which also opened in the 2019–2020 school year. All the public schools in Herriman are run by the Jordan School District.

Herriman also is home to five charter schools: Providence Hall High School, Providence Hall Junior High School, Providence Hall Elementary School, and Athlos Academy. Another, Advantage Arts Academy, was recently opened on 11800 S.

Sports

Herriman is home to the Zions Bank Real Academy, a soccer complex that serves as the training facility for Real Salt Lake of Major League Soccer. The complex includes Zions Bank Stadium, a 5,000-seat stadium for MLS Next Pro affiliate Real Monarchs and the Utah Warriors of Major League Rugby.

Public services 
Herriman maintains most of its own services, including police, water, animal services, and roads. Herriman contracts with Rocky Mountain Power, Wasatch Waste and recycling, Dominion Energy, South Valley Sewer, and Unified Fire Authority.

Herriman is home to the Herriman Historical Committee, Be Ready Herriman, the Herriman Arts Council, Herriman Trails Committee, the Herriman Youth Council, and Healthy Herriman.

Notable people 

 Francis Bernard, American football player
 Jeff Dewsnup, soccer player
 Blake Freeland, American football player
 Henry Harriman, LDS leader
 Andre James, American football player
 Robert Kirby, humor columnist
 John Knotwell, former member of the Utah House of Representatives
 Edwin Mulitalo, NFL coach and former player
 Rhyan White, swimmer
 Thomas Levi Whittle, Canadian farmer and early LDS figure

See also

 List of cities and towns in Utah

References

External links

 

Cities in Salt Lake County, Utah
Cities in Utah
Salt Lake City metropolitan area
Populated places established in 1851
1851 establishments in Utah Territory